Biedron is a surname of Polish language origin. Notable people with the surname include:

Robert Biedroń (born 1976), Polish LGBT activist and politician
Sandra G. Biedron (born 1973), American-European physicist
Wolfgang Biedron (born 1951), Swedish judoka

See also
 
 Biedronka

References

Polish-language surnames